Cornhole is a lawn game.

Cornhole or Corn Hole may also refer to:

 Corn Hole, a named spring at Hot Springs National Park
 "Corn Holes", a 2004 song by the Focus Group, from the album Sketches and Spells
 Cornhole (slang), a vulgarism for anus or anal sex

See also
 "Cornholers & Confederates", a 2000 comedy track by Jackie Martling from F Jackie
 Cornholio, an alter-ego of Beavis from the cartoon Beavis and Butt-Head